The Wind (formerly Austin James Band) is a vocally driven, indie rock band from Southern California.  The group consists of Chad Marshman (guitar, piano, vocals) and brothers Chip (drums, percussion, vocals) and Nick (bass, vocals) Knechtel.  Their “sound has been likened to the Beatles” with “hints of the Beach Boys and Queen,” "60’s drug rock mixed with modern indie stylings,” and “sunny-sweet Vaudeville-style pop.”
 
Their first recording, Histor (originally released under the title "Goes to Austin James Land"), is a 7-song self-produced EP.  This recording received mostly positive reviews, deemed as “tak[ing] your traditional indie rock and [making] it a production.”
 
They have been in the studio for much of 2010, self-recording and producing their biggest project yet, a 23-song double album entitled Harum-Scarum.  The release date is set for late October 2010.

Discography

Histor EP (2008)
"A Message for You" – 0:24
"Underwater" – 3:19
"Modern World" – 3:48
"Time" – 3:14
"Crazy Cat" – 3:51
"Blue" – 3:35
"A Great Get Together" – 4:03

Harum-Scarum (2010)

Disk 1
"Shellwhite" – 2:51
"Hathor" – 3:52
"Marvel Me" – 3:05
"Pussyfoot" – 3:01
"Oh, Hadihu" – 3:01
"Do Geese See God? Yes." – 0:35
"Lucy" – 3:49
"Come On" – 4:40
"Clemencious" – 3:36
"Unless, I'm a Liar" – 2:39
"Bruise-Eyed" – 3:45
"Hathor Reprise" – 3:28

Disk 2
"An Astral Dance and a Shared Dream" – 2:30
"Sunshine and Peace of Mind" – 3:38
"All the Country Roads" – 4:12
"I'ze Born a Rich Man" – 3:28
"Some Place" – 4:49
"27 Cent Blues" – 5:28
"Distractions" – 4:50
"This is the Modern World" – 3:30
"I am the Same as Yesterday" – 5:07
"Yankee Brig" – 4:32
"Monsters" – 5:55

References

External links 
 The Wind Official Website
 The Wind Facebook Page

Indie rock musical groups from California
Psychedelic pop music groups
Psychedelic rock music groups from California